Mary Leigh (née Brown; 1885–1978) was an English political activist and suffragette.

Life
Leigh was born as Mary or Marie Brown in 1885. She was born in Manchester and was a schoolteacher until her marriage to a builder, surnamed Leigh. She joined the Women's Social and Political Union (WSPU) in 1906, aged 20 or 21. In 1908 Leigh, Jennie Baines, Lucy Burns, Alice Paul, Emily Davison and Mabel Capper were arrested for trying to stop a Limehouse meeting on the Budget by Lloyd George. On 17 September 1909, she, Charlotte Marsh and Patricia Woodlock climbed onto the roof of Bingley Hall in Birmingham to protest at being excluded from a political meeting where the British Prime Minister H. H. Asquith was giving a speech. They threw tiles which they levered up with an axe at Asquith's car and at the police. Leigh was given sentences totaling four months in Winson Green Prison. There she again protested about not being treated as a political prisoner by breaking a window and by going on hunger strike. Leigh and Patricia Woodlock were force-fed in Winson Green gaol in 1909.

Leigh had been given a Hunger Strike Medal 'for Valour' by WSPU.

On 18 July 1912 in Dublin, she threw a hatchet at Asquith, hitting instead Irish nationalist leader John Redmond who was injured. Leigh was unhappy with the WSPU, but refused to leave when Emmeline Pankhurst asked for loyalty or for members to leave. She remained loyal as she felt an ownership for the organisation she had helped create.

After Emily Davison was run over by the King's horse at the Epsom Derby in 1913, Leigh and Rose Yates was at the dying Davison's bedside, and headed a guard of honour for the funeral procession. On 13 October 1913, at the Bow Baths in the East End of London, Leigh was hurt when police were hitting women and men protestors with clubs, according to Mrs Pankhurst. World War I precipitated a split between Leigh, Yates and other leading suffragettes with Emmeline Pankhurst. Pankhurst had agreed that the WSPU would suspend its militant campaign for female suffrage and back the government's fight against Germany. Leigh and other radicals disagreed with this policy, and broke away to form the "Suffragettes of the WSPU" (SWSPU). The organisation intended to be militant and national but never achieved a large impact. Like the Independent WSPU, it was created in 1916. The SWSPU passed a resolution to concentrate on women's suffrage and to not encourage debate about former WSPU leaders.

Terrorism
Simon Webb, author of a book on suffragette terrorism, wrote in a letter to The Guardian that Leigh and other radical suffragettes set fire to a theatre full of people and bombed it. They were prosecuted for "endangering life".

See also
 Women's suffrage in the United Kingdom
 Suffragette bombing and arson campaign
 Representation of the People Act 1918
 Representation of the People Act 1928

References

External links

British people of World War I
English women in politics
British women's rights activists
English feminists
English suffragists
Feminism and history
Politicians from Manchester
1885 births
1978 deaths
20th-century English criminals
Prisoners and detainees of England and Wales
Women's Social and Political Union
Hunger Strike Medal recipients